The Honourable Bouverie Francis Primrose  (1813–1898) was a 19th-century British landowner and administrator.

Life

He was born on 19 September 1813 near Edinburgh the second  son of Archibald Primrose, 4th Earl of Rosebery and his wife Harriett Bouverie. In 1817 the family moved into the then-new Dalmeny House.

In 1839 he was appointed Receiver General for the Post Office in Scotland. He also served as secretary of the Joint Board of Manufacture and Fisheries for most of his life. He lived with his family at 22 Moray Place a huge Georgian townhouse on the Moray Estate in western Edinburgh.

He held the rank of Lt Colonel in the Queen's City of Edinburgh Rifle Volunteer Brigade.

He was elected a Fellow of the Royal Society of Edinburgh in 1849. His proposer was Sir John Murray, Lord Murray.

He retired in 1882 and died on 20 March 1898 aged 84. He is buried at the west end of one of the lower terraces in the churchyard of St John's, Edinburgh, at the west end of Princes Street.

Family

In 1838 he married Frederica Sophia Anson (1814-1867), daughter of Thomas Anson, 1st Viscount Anson.  Their eight children included Henry Primrose (1846-1923), footballer Gilbert E. Primrose (1848–1935), and Vice Admiral George Anson Primrose (1849-1930).

He was uncle to Archibald Primrose, 5th Earl of Rosebery who served as the British Prime Minister 1894/5.

Artistic recognition

His portrait (c.1870) by Robert Herdman is held by the Scottish National Portrait Gallery but is rarely displayed.

References

1813 births
1898 deaths
Fellows of the Royal Society of Edinburgh
Younger sons of earls
Bouverie